Cupeyalia subterranea is a species of beetle in the family Cerambycidae, and the only species in the genus Cupeyalia. It was described by Zayas in 1975.

References

Parmenini
Beetles described in 1975